"Arms Around You" is a collaborative single by American rappers XXXTentacion and Lil Pump featuring Colombian singer Maluma and American singer and rapper Swae Lee. It was released on October 25, 2018, and is produced by Skrillex, Mally Mall, JonFX.

Background
The track was originally written and recorded in 2017 with Rio Santana, who appeared on XXXTentacion's ? album, but after XXXTentacion's death, the label took over and added other co-features. Lil Pump contacted XXXTentacion's mother Cleopatra Bernard after his death to ask if he could make a song to "honor his legacy", which resulted in the collaboration.

Critical reception
Rap-Up called the track a "global crossover track" featuring "Latin, alternative, hip-hop and pop influences". Michael Saponara of Billboard wrote that XXXTentacion "implements an intoxicating flow mixed with some Spanish over the Mally Mall, Jon FX, handling the reggaeton-tinged track's chorus duties". C. Vernon Coleman II of XXL also felt the track had a "reggaeton feel", with Pump "stunt[ing] heavy as usual" and Swae Lee delivering a "rosy verse". In addition, Winston Cook-Wilson of Spin called the track "house-inflected".

While Ben Kaye of Consequence of Sound labeled it a "Latin-flavored club jam", he also stated that the timing of its release was "a bit of cringeworthy irony" with XXXTentacion's line in the chorus about protecting someone, Kaye said a recently released recording features him "confessing to multiple violent crimes including assaulting his girlfriend and stabbing eight people", though this interpretation of the recording was disputed. Brendan Klinkenberg of Rolling Stone felt that the song is "bland, Latin-inflected pop that reflects none of the talents of its four collaborators" and also called it "a mish-mash of vague pop-in-2018 signifiers without cohering into any sort of artistic statement".

Promotion
Skrillex initially teased the track on Twitter and previewed the track on his Instagram, but later deleted the post. NME noted that the post featured the hashtag "#LLJ" which stands for "Long Live Jahseh", which was XXXTentacion's real name.

Music video
A music video for "Arms Around You" was released on November 16, 2018. It was directed by James Lerese and features an animated XXXTentacion.

Personnel
Credits adapted from Tidal.

 XXXTentacion – vocals, composition
 Lil Pump – vocals, composition
 Maluma – vocals, composition
 Swae Lee – vocals, composition
 Edgar Barrera – composition, engineer
 Rio Santana – composition
 Skrillex – production, composition, mix engineer
 Mally Mall – production
 JonFX – production
 Rashawn Mclean – assistant mix engineer
 Mike Seaberg – assistant mix engineer
 Jacob Richards – assistant mix engineer
 Brandon Brown – assistant mix engineer
 Gerald Yusuf — recording engineer
 Koen Heldens – mix engineer
 Tom Norris – mix engineer
 Jaycen Joshua – mix engineer
 Dave Kutch – mastering engineer
 Gil Corber - A&R Consultant 
 Eesean Bolden - A&R

Charts

Weekly charts

Year-end charts

Certifications

References

External links

2018 singles
2018 songs
XXXTentacion songs
Lil Pump songs
Maluma songs
Swae Lee songs
Song recordings produced by Skrillex
Songs released posthumously
Songs written by Swae Lee
Songs written by XXXTentacion
Songs written by Edgar Barrera
Songs written by Lil Pump
Songs written by Maluma (singer)
Songs written by Skrillex
Music controversies
Electronic dance music songs
Dancehall songs